This is a list of the counties of the United Kingdom. The history of local government in the United Kingdom differs between England, Northern Ireland, Scotland and Wales, and the subnational divisions within these which have been called counties have varied over time and by purpose. The county has formed the upper tier of local government over much of the United Kingdom at one time or another, and has been used for a variety of other purposes, such as for Lord Lieutenants, land registration and postal delivery. This list is split by constituent country, time period and purpose.

England

Changes between the 1990s and 2009 subdivided the short-lived non-metropolitan counties of Cleveland and Humberside into unitary authorities, but the former county names continue for fire services and police forces (see ). Similarly the short-lived county of Avon provides part of the area and name of Avon and Somerset Police and its area is roughly that of the Avon Fire and Rescue Service.

The historic counties of Yorkshire, Cumberland, Westmorland, Huntingdonshire and Middlesex are the five defunct ceremonial counties which were historically counties. With their abolition as ceremonial counties, Yorkshire is divided for that purpose into the East Riding of Yorkshire, North Yorkshire, South Yorkshire and West Yorkshire, Cumberland and Westmorland were combined with a former exclave of Lancashire to form Cumbria, Huntingdonshire merged into Cambridgeshire, and the vastly greater part of Middlesex became part of Greater London.

Contemporary reference to the Isle of Ely and nearby Soke of Peterborough has been very rare since the early 20th century and they have scant public resonance. The counties marked in italics below are neither ceremonial nor historic.

The list does not include the 61 county boroughs (1889–1974) or the 18 counties corporate (before 1889), each of which was an administrative county for a single town or city, within a larger "county-at-large".

Northern Ireland

Scotland

Wales

See also
Toponymical list of counties of the United Kingdom
List of United Kingdom county nicknames
Counties of Ireland
 Alias Data

References

Counties of the United Kingdom